The  South Heart River is a river of Alberta. It empties into Lesser Slave Lake and is the largest river flowing into it.

Rivers of Alberta